El Cronista (Spanish: The Reporter) is a daily business newspaper published in Buenos Aires, Argentina.

It was founded by Martin Giménez Antonio and first published as El Cronista Comercial on November 1, 1908.  In 1989 the name was changed to El Cronista.

It was the first business daily newspaper in Argentina.  In 1994, it was the first newspaper in Argentina to publish online.

It is published by Unidad Editorial.

In 2021, it was acquired by Grupo América for 6 million USD.

See also 
 Communications in Argentina
 List of newspapers in Argentina

References

Daily newspapers published in Argentina
Spanish-language newspapers
Newspapers established in 1908
Mass media in Buenos Aires
1908 establishments in Argentina
Business newspapers
Argentine news websites
2021 mergers and acquisitions